Emil S. Ladyko (May 22, 1923 – June 2, 2011) was an American football player and coach. He served as the head football coach at Arizona State Teachers College at Flagstaff—now known as Northern Arizona University—in 1949, compiling a record of 1–6–1.

Ladyko initially played college football at the University of Notre Dame in 1944. He later transferred to Columbia University and ultimately participated as an off-season member of the Philadelphia Eagles in 1947.

Head coaching record

References

External links
 

1923 births
2011 deaths
American football ends
Colby Mules football coaches
Columbia Lions football coaches
Columbia Lions football players
Notre Dame Fighting Irish football players
Philadelphia Eagles players
Northern Arizona Lumberjacks football coaches
People from Bridgeport, Connecticut
Players of American football from Connecticut